The men's artistic team all-around gymnastic event at the 2015 Pan American Games was held on July 11 at the Toronto Coliseum. This event also acted as the qualification for the all-around and event finals.

Schedule
All times are Eastern Standard Time (UTC-3).

Team Competition

Qualification results

Individual all-around
Osvaldo Martinez of Argentina finished in 16th but did not progress to the final due to the fact that his teammates, Nicolas Cordoba and Federico Molinari qualified ahead of him.

Floor
Paul Ruggeri of the United States finished in 5th but did not progress to the final due to the fact that his US teammates, Samuel Mikulak and Donnell Whittenburg qualified ahead of him.

Pommel horse

Rings

Vault

Parallel bars

Horizontal bar

References

Gymnastics at the 2015 Pan American Games